Farriolla is a genus of fungi in the Ascomycota phylum. The relationship of this taxon to other taxa within the phylum is unknown (incertae sedis), and it has not yet been placed with certainty into any class, order, or family.

The genus name of Farriolla is in honour of William Farr (1807–1883), who was a British epidemiologist, regarded as one of the founders of medical statistics.

The genus was circumscribed by Johannes Musaeus Norman in Öfvers. Kongl. Vetensk.-Akad. Förh. Vol.41 (Issue 4) on page  134 in 1884.

See also
 List of Ascomycota genera incertae sedis

References

External links
Index Fungorum

Ascomycota enigmatic taxa